Mao (stylized MAO or Mao At Home) is an Irish-headquartered restaurant chain, serving Asian cuisine: Thai, Chinese, Japanese, Indonesian, Singaporean, Sichuan and Mongolian dishes are all offered.

History

The first Mao restaurant opened on Chatham Row, Dublin in 1997. The name attracted some criticism, given Mao Zedong's role in the Great Leap Forward, Cultural Revolution, Great Chinese Famine and Sinicization of Tibet; during his time as leader of China, he was allegedly responsible for millions of deaths. This first restaurant was decorated with Andy Warhol's famous silkscreen print of Mao.

In 2010 the chain went into receivership and was sold to Colm and Ciarán Butler.

References

External links
 Official website

Restaurants established in 1997
Fast-food chains of Ireland
Restaurants in the Republic of Ireland
Noodle restaurants
Irish companies established in 1997